David George Logan (born July 2, 1954) is a Canadian retired professional ice hockey player.

Early life 
Logan was born in Montreal. As a youth, he played in the 1966 and 1967 Quebec International Pee-Wee Hockey Tournaments with a minor ice hockey team from Dorval.

Career 
Between 1974 and 1983, Logan played in 218 NHL games with the Chicago Black Hawks and Vancouver Canucks over parts of six seasons.

Career statistics

References

External links

1954 births
Birmingham South Stars players
Canadian ice hockey defencemen
Chicago Blackhawks draft picks
Chicago Blackhawks players
Cincinnati Tigers players
Dallas Black Hawks players
Flint Generals players
Ice hockey people from Montreal
Laval National players
Living people
Maine Mariners players
Montreal Junior Canadiens players
Montreal Bleu Blanc Rouge players
Quebec Nordiques (WHA) draft picks
St. Catharines Saints players
Vancouver Canucks players